Auxiliary Power's Demolition Derby and Figure 8 Race is a PC demolition derby and figure 8 racing game. The game was developed by John C. Ardussi with the help of real demolition derby drivers and officials.

Gameplay
In this game, there are 4 difficulty levels and 9 different original tracks. There are 11 original body styles and over 50 original AI(computer) drivers. Engines smoke, stall, steam, and backfire. Vehicles get realistic damage. Just like real demolition derby, there is a heat, and then a final. You can get black flagged for sandbagging, or avoiding hits on purpose. Players start at a local level, then move on to regional then national level.

References

External links
 Auxiliary Power official website

2001 video games
Racing video games
Vehicular combat games
Video games developed in the United States
Windows games
Windows-only games
Multiplayer and single-player video games